Aunty Jack Introduces Colour is a one-off television special edition of The Aunty Jack Show, broadcast on ABC television on the night of 28 February 1975. It was created two years after The Aunty Jack Show finished, and featured the main character, Aunty Jack, played by Grahame Bond, even though she had been killed off in the last season in 1973.  The episode was five minutes long and was the first show on ABC television to be broadcast in colour.

Features
The special shows the three main characters trying to combat the invasion of television by the colour monster, but Aunty Jack (Grahame Bond), Thin Arthur (Rory O'Donoghue), and Kid Eager (Garry McDonald) are swallowed into the world of colour television, as colour wipes from the bottom to the top of the screen, converting the ABC television into colour. The characters attempt to resist, with Aunty Jack making a futile endeavour to fight the process with "colour remover".

Cast 
 Aunty Jack - Grahame Bond
 Kid Eager - Garry McDonald
 Thin Arthur - Rory O'Donoghue

Broadcast dates (ABC)
The special started at three minutes to midnight, so that the episode would swipe to colour at midnight, beating all other Australian commercial television stations, which changed to colour on 1 March 1975, although many sources incorrectly say that the episode was aired on 1 March.

Australia - 28 February 1975

Technical information 
Length - 5 mins.

Aspect ratio - 4:3

See also 

 Aunty Jack Sings Wollongong
 Farewell Aunty Jack
 Wollongong the Brave

Notes

References

External links

Australian television specials
Australian comedy short films
The Aunty Jack Show
1975 short films
1970s English-language films
Films directed by Maurice Murphy